The Clemson Tigers college football team competes as part of the National Collegiate Athletic Association (NCAA) Division I Football Bowl Subdivision, representing Clemson University in the Atlantic Division of the Atlantic Coast Conference (ACC). Clemson has played their home games at Memorial Stadium in Clemson, South Carolina since 1942.  The Tigers have three national championship titles (1981, 2016 and 2018) along with two other national championship appearances in 2015 and 2019. The Tigers have claimed 26 conference championships and have appeared in 50 postseason bowl games with an overall record of 28-22.  Clemson now has over 750 wins in its program.

Seasons

Notes

References

Works cited

Clemson Tigers

Clemson Tigers football seasons